The Army Group Gallwitz or Army Group C (German: Heeresgruppe Gallwitz) was an Army Group of the German Army, which operated on the Western Front under command of Max von Gallwitz, between 1 February 1918 and 11 November 1918 during World War I.

Composition 

 German 5th Army (Max von Gallwitz then Georg von der Marwitz)  
 German Armee-Abteilung C

Sources
The Soldier's Burden
Die Deutschen Heeresgruppen im Ersten Weltkrieg
Bundesarchiv : Die deutschen Heeresgruppen Teil 1, Erster Weltkrieg

Gallwitz
Military units and formations of Germany in World War I
Military units and formations established in 1918
Military units and formations disestablished in 1915